Lookout Pass Ski and Recreation Area is a ski area in the western United States. Lookout Pass operates seven days per week from mid-December  until late March then six days a week (closed Tuesday) until closing, which is usually mid-April.

There are two quad chairlifts, two triple chairlifts and one double chairlift at Lookout Pass, with  average annual snowfall exceeding .

The elevation of the highway pass on I-90 is a moderate . Lookout Pass is considered the eastern boundary of Idaho's Silver Valley mining region.

History

Opened  in 1935, the Lookout Pass ski area operates under a special-use permit of the U.S. Forest Service, in the Idaho Panhandle National Forests (formerly the Coeur d'Alene National Forest). Gradual enhancement of the area has occurred over the decades, and the first chairlift was installed in the summer of 1982.

The community ski hill, run by the nonprofit Idaho Ski Club, was sold in 1992 to Lookout Recreation, Inc., a company formed by two 27-year-old former college roommates, Don Walde of Wallace and Jim Fowler. After seven years, it was sold in 1999 to Lookout Associates, headed by Phil Edholm, and plans for expansion soon followed.

Expansion
A new portion of the ski area opened on December 26, 2003, on the Montana side of the border (which is irregular in this area, following mountains, and is actually due south, see topo map). The new Timber Wolf double chair and five new runs increased the vertical drop (by lowering the base to ), and the longest new run  in length.  Two of the new runs are rated advanced and three are rated intermediate, with views of the St. Regis and Copper Basins.  Additional expansion in 2006 with a chairlift on the Idaho "North Side" opened additional intermediate and expert terrain.  In the summer of 2020 the original Chair #1, a 1982 Riblet center-pole double, was replaced by a new Skytrac fixed grip quad. The Eagle Peak expansion added 500 acres with 14 new trails serviced by a new quad chairlift to the West. Eagle Peak chairlift operations began Friday 12/16/2022, followed by an official opening ceremony on 12/17. The previous season Eagle Peak was accessible on a limited basis via snowcat.

U.S. Ski Team
 Beverly Anderson (born 1938) – 1960 Olympian
 Jim Barrier (1940–2000) – 1960 Olympian

Route of the Hiawatha Trail

It is named for the Olympian Hiawatha passenger trains (1947–1961) of the Chicago, Milwaukee, St. Paul and Pacific Railroad ("Milwaukee Road"), on whose abandoned rights of way, trestles, and tunnels the gravel trail rests.

The Route of the Hiawatha Trail stretches from St. Regis, Montana, to Pearson, Idaho, (elevation ), several miles north of Avery, (equidistantly south of Mullan).

Bus service is available to take bicycle riders back to the start of the trail. A fee is charged for riding the trail, and during the winter months the trail is closed. Parking and unimproved camping spots are available at the trail's start, as well as at the end of the trail. Several other trails are nearby for further exploration; one of these follows the old road along the North Fork of the St. Joe River to Avery and has an improved campground at its start.

Another nearby rail trail is the Trail of the Coeur d'Alenes; from Mullan it travels over  westbound, descending the Coeur d'Alene River through Silver Valley and crossing Lake Coeur d'Alene. It follows the former right-of-way of the Union Pacific Railroad.

See also
Taft, Montana

References

External links

Ski Lifts.org - photos of lifts at Lookout Pass
Ski Map.org – trail maps – Lookout Pass
Hentges, Katherine “Lookout Pass” Spokane Historical
Idaho Ski Resorts.com - Lookout Pass
U.S. Forest Service - Route of The Hiawatha
Idaho Panhandle National Forests - official site
Montana Dept. of Transportation - webcam - Lookout Pass - Interstate 90

Ski areas and resorts in Montana
Ski areas and resorts in Idaho
Buildings and structures in Shoshone County, Idaho
Buildings and structures in Mineral County, Montana
Rail trails in Idaho
Rail trails in Montana
Mountain biking venues in the United States
Tourist attractions in Mineral County, Montana
Tourist attractions in Shoshone County, Idaho
Idaho Panhandle National Forest
2003 establishments in Montana